Cyana grandis is a moth of the family Erebidae first described by Paul Mabille in 1879. It is found on Madagascar.

This species is white, with three transversal red lines on the forewings.

References
Mabille (1879). "Lepidoptera Madagascariensia; species novae". Bulletin de la Société Philomathique. (7) 3: 132–144.

External links
Illustration on Hampson Plate. Catalogue of the Lepidoptera Phalaenae in the British Museum 2: plate 26, fig.18

Cyana
Moths described in 1879
Lepidoptera of Madagascar
Moths of Madagascar
Moths of Africa